William Brown (2 December 1895–1979) was a Scottish footballer who played in the Football League for Coventry City, Norwich City and Wolverhampton Wanderers.

References

1902 births
1985 deaths
Scottish footballers
Association football midfielders
English Football League players
Bellshill Athletic F.C. players
Coventry City F.C. players
Wolverhampton Wanderers F.C. players
Norwich City F.C. players